The 1997 Beach Volleyball World Championships, were held from September 10 to September 13, 1997, in Los Angeles, California (United States). It was the first official edition of this event, after 10 unofficial championships between 1987 and 1996.

Men's competition

Final ranking (top sixteen)
 A total number of 56 participating couples

Women's competition
 A total number of 45 participating couples

Final ranking (top sixteen)

References
 Beach Volleyball Results

1997
W
B
B
B
Beach volleyball competitions in the United States
Volleyball in California